Malcolm Hill may refer to:

 Malcolm Hill (footballer) (born 1938), former Australian rules footballer
 Malcolm Hill (audio engineer), public address system pioneer
 Malcolm Hill (basketball) (born 1995), American professional basketball player
 Malcolm Hill (cyclist) (born 1954), Australian cyclist